Taufiq Wahby (1891–1984) was a prominent Kurdish writer, linguist and politician. He first served in the Ottoman army as a colonel, but after the creation of Iraq by the British in 1920, he became an influential officer in the new Iraqi army. He also served eight terms in ministerial posts in the Iraqi government. He was instrumental in the design of a new Kurdish alphabet based on modified Arabic letters. Taufiq Wahbi also engaged in research concerning Yazidis and their religion.

Books

 "Destûrî Zimanî Kurdî (Grammar of Kurdish Language), al-Haditha Publishers", Baghdad, 1929.
 "Xwêndewarî Baw (Contemporary Literacy), al-Haditha Publishers", Baghdad, 1933.
 "The remnants of Mithraism in Hatra and Iraqi Kurdistan, and its traces in Yazidism: The Yazidis are not devil-worshippers", 1962. 
 "A Kurdish-English Dictionary, with C.J. Edmonds, 179 pp., Oxford Press", 1966.
 "Kurdish Studies, Kurdica Publishers", 1968.

References

External links
 Tawfiq Wahby, By Dilan Roshani, Kurdish Academy of Language.
 A Kurdish-English Dictionary By Taufiq Wahby and Cecil John Edmonds.

1891 births
1984 deaths
Linguists from Iraq
Kurdish scholars
Kurdish-language writers
Government ministers of Iraq
Iraqi Kurdistani politicians
Historians of religion
Iraqi religion academics
Iraqi historians
20th-century linguists